Vic Hutfield (born Gosport, Hampshire 26 May 1887) was a British engineer and builder of aircraft, including The R.A.S. (Mr. Reader, Mr. Allen and Mr. Sheffield) monoplane in 1909.

In 1939 Hutfield bought the old military prison (Forton prison), in Lees Lane, Gosport, demolished it and built houses.
Hutfield Link road in Gosport is named after him.

He also manufactured the Hutfield JAP Motorcycle.

He operated the Hutfield Coach's in Gosport

Hutfield made an audio recording of his attempts to fly in 1958; the original is now stored in the Wessex Film and Sound Archive (WFSA) and uploaded to YouTube.

References

External links
Wessex Film and Sound Archive

English mechanical engineers
People from Gosport
1887 births
Year of death missing